Viktor Löwenfeld (born 1 May 1889), also spelled Victor Löwenfelt, was a former defending Austrian football player and trainer. He played in Austrian(-Hungarian) clubs, appeared as international and managed Belgian teams among which the Belgium national football team.

Player career
Löwenfeld played in the defence of Austrian clubs between 1909 and 1918 at the time he was selected for the Austrian football side of Austria-Hungary. One of the clubs was Wiener Amateur Sportverein, the current FK Austria Wien.  By 1922 he was playing in Yugoslavia in Zagreb.

Managerial career
In 1925 he was coaching HŠK Concordia in Yugoslavia.  At the 1928 Summer Olympics, Löwenfeld made his entrance as manager of the Belgian football team. With this team he reached the quarter-finals, and he would keep coaching the team until 1930. In that year he changed the national squad for Antwerp FC, which he led to the Belgian title in his first season as head coach. In total, he was Antwerp's manager during 4 seasons.

Managerial palmares
Belgium national football team
14 matches as trainer (11 friendly, 3 Olympic)
1928 Summer Olympics
Place in quarter-finals

Antwerp FC
Belgian First Division
Winner (1): 1930–31

References

1889 births
Year of death missing
People from the Kingdom of Bohemia
Footballers from Prague
Austrian footballers
Austria international footballers
Austrian football managers
Association football defenders
FK Austria Wien players
Belgium national football team managers
Expatriate football managers in Belgium
Austrian expatriate sportspeople in Belgium
Royal Antwerp F.C. managers
Austrian expatriate football managers
Expatriate football managers in Yugoslavia
Austrian expatriate sportspeople in Yugoslavia